Disappearance is an unfinished, posthumously-published autobiographical novella of wartime childhood by Soviet writer Yury Trifonov. Trifonov started work on the novel in the 1960s, telling childhood stories against the background of the disappearances of family and friends in the years 1937-1942, during the Second World War, and during Stalin's purges.

References

1960s novels
Novels by Yury Trifonov